Paraona micans is a moth of the  family Erebidae. It is found on Java.

References

 Natural History Museum Lepidoptera generic names catalog

Lithosiina
Moths described in 1895